The 1899–1900 Brown men's ice hockey season was the 3rd season of play for the program.

Season
After beginning their program with two winning seasons, the men's hockey team had a dreadful third year, losing 5 of their seven games and being hopelessly outmatched in those games. The only contests they didn't were the two against teams playing in their first year. Unfortunately, this began a trend of losing for Brown that would not be corrected for almost 30 years.

Charles Cooke was captain of the team despite not playing in any games and having graduated in 1899.

Note: Brown University did not formally adopt the Bear as its mascot until the fall of 1905.

Roster

Standings

Schedule and Results

|-
!colspan=12 style=";" | Regular Season

References

Brown Bears men's ice hockey seasons
Brown
Brown
Brown
Brown